Frederick William Grubb (16 October 1844 – 28 April 1923) was an Australian politician.

He was born in Launceston, the eldest son of William Dawson Grubb. In 1879 he was elected to the Tasmanian Legislative Council as the member for Tamar, replacing the previous member—his father—who had died.  In 1880 his seat was declared vacant due to absence. In 1881 he returned to the Council as the member for Meander, the seat he represented until his retirement in 1911. Grubb died in Launceston in 1923.

References

1844 births
1923 deaths
Independent members of the Parliament of Tasmania
Members of the Tasmanian Legislative Council
19th-century Australian politicians
20th-century Australian politicians